Innofactor Plc is a Finnish software provider focused on Microsoft solutions  in the Nordic Countries. Innofactor delivers to its customers IT projects as a system integrator and develops its own software products and services. The focus area in its own product development is Microsoft's cloud solutions. In 2021 approximately half of Innofactor's net sales came from recurring contracts. Innofactor's customers include over 1,000 private and public sector organizations.

Innofactor Plc is listed on the Nasdaq OMX Helsinki Stock Exchange. In 2021 Innofactor’s net sales were approximately EUR 66.4 million, which shows an increase of 0.3% from the earlier year.

History

The operations of Innofactor started when Risto Linturi contacted Sami Ensio in October 1999 and asked him to lead a new company. It was decided to establish the company on the foundation of a company called Yritysmikrot, a subsidiary of investment company R. Linturi, founded in 1983 and owned by Risto and Kaija Linturi. The company's current form of operations started on January 1, 2000.

In 2006–2010, Innofactor grew by almost 50 percent each year. At the end of 2010 Innofactor Ltd made a reverse listing on the Helsinki Stock Exchange by acquiring Westend ICT Plc (formerly known as TJ Group), as a result of which the company name was changed to Innofactor Plc. Innofactor was registered in the Trade Register on January 5, 2011, and its stock symbol in the Helsinki Stock Exchange became IFA1V on January 7, 2011.

In 2012 Innofactor acquired Bridgeconsulting A/S from its management. Bridgeconsulting was a Danish IT services company focusing on producing business intelligence solutions based on Microsoft technology. Innofactor acquired also project and project portfolio management business from Tietotalo Infocenter.

In June 2013, the acquisition of technology company atBusiness Ltd almost doubled Innofactor’s size. atBusiness employed approximately 200 people.

In October 2013, Innofactor acquired Dynamic Team’s Microsoft Dynamics AX business from Tampere Finland and in December 2013 Innofactor acquired Enabling Group in Denmark.

In December 2015, Innofactor acquired a rapidly growing Cinteros from Sweden.

In October 2016, Innofactor acquired Lumigate, a company specialized in Microsoft cloud. Lumigate operated in Norway, Sweden and Denmark with 70 employees.

Innofactor's net sales on 2016 were EUR 59,616 thousand and the average number of personnel was 532. The market value of the share capital at the closing price of the review period was EUR 37,837 thousand.

In 2019, the Finnish Tax Administration selected Innofactor as the primary provider of IT specialist services in the area of cloud specialists. The total value of the transaction is approximately 10–20 million euros.

In the spring and summer of 2020, during the corona crisis, over 99 percent of Innofactor’s employees worked remotely. The company also hired new employees, and its net sales and operating margin (EBITDA) were higher as regards the comparison period.

In June 2022, Innofactor acquired Invenco Ltd, a Finnish company specialized in data and analytics.

In 2022, Innofactor won the largest transaction in its history when The Finnish Defence Forces selected Innofactor as the provider of an information management solution. The total value of the procurement is 22 million euros.

Organization
Innofactor headquarters is in Keilaniemi, Espoo. Other offices in Finland are located in Kajaani, Kuopio, Lappeenranta, Tampere, Turku, Jyväskylä and Oulu. Their Danish office is located in Copenhagen, the Swedish office in Stockholm, and the Norwegian offices are in Bergen, Oslo, Trondheim and Stavanger.

Market
Innofactor’s customers are private, public and third-sector organizations.  For example, Innofactor's ICT expert resources can support the definition, programming, testing and management of new and existing cloud-based systems.

Awards and recognitions
 Innofactor has been chosen as Microsoft's Partner of the Year in Finland in 2011 and 2015 
 Innofactor's founder and CEO Sami Ensio was elected as the Software Entrepreneur of the Year by Finnish Software and E-business Association Ohjelmistoyrittäjät ry in 2011
 According to Kauppalehti, Finnish commerce oriented newspaper, Innofactor was one of the most successful listed companies in Finland in 2013
 Together with the Hospital District of Helsinki and Uusimaa, Innofactor was chosen as the winner of the 2018 Microsoft Health Innovation Awards' Outstanding Innovation category with the virtual hospital solution.

References

External links 

 

Companies listed on Nasdaq Helsinki
Software companies of Finland